

Competitions

Friendlies

Divizia A

League table

Results by round

Results summary

Matches

Cupa României

Players

Squad statistics

Transfers

In

Out

References

ASC Oțelul Galați seasons
Otelul Galati